Kevin Bromley (born October 22, 1959) is an American former basketball coach, who was most recently an assistant at UC Santa Barbara. Bromley joined UCSB as an assistant coach in 2011. He was the head coach for Cal Poly from 2001–2009, compiling an overall record of 99–145.

Before coaching

Bromley played college basketball for Mid-Plains Community College and Colorado State. He graduated from CSU in 1983 with a bachelor's degree in Physical Education. He earned a master's in Education Administration a year later.

Coaching career

Bromley's first coaching job was as an assistant at Colorado State, beginning in 1984.

He would leave CSU to coach at Chemeketa Community College, where his teams had a 56–7 record over two seasons.

After Bromley left Chemeketa, he spent time an assistant at Cal Poly Pomona and Southern Utah, before arriving at Cal Poly in 1995. When Cal Poly's head coach left in the middle of the 2000–01 season, Bromley became the interim head coach. At the end of the season, Bromley was given the job full-time, despite a 4–12 record as interim coach.

In 2002–03, just his second full season as the Mustangs' head coach, Bromley's team went 16–14, and reached the finals of the Big West Conference Tournament. The next three seasons were a struggle.

In the 2006–07 season, Bromley's team was 19–11, a record number of wins for Cal Poly in its Division I era. They again reached the championship game of the Big West Tournament, but were defeated.

Bromley was fired by Cal Poly following the 2008–09 season, in which he led the Mustangs to a 7–21 overall mark and a 3–13 Big West record. Bromley's overall head coaching record was 99–145.

Subsequently, in May 2010, he joined UC Santa Barbara as an assistant coach. After helping UCSB advance to the NCAA Tournament in 2011, Bromley was fired along with head coach Bob Williams after recording a 6–22 record in 2017. He then transitioned into a role of director of development at UCSB, coordinating various fundraising efforts for the Gauchos' athletic department.

Career coaching record

References

 Big West – Kevin Bromley Profile

External links
 GoPoly.com – official biography

1959 births
Living people
Basketball coaches from Colorado
American men's basketball players
Basketball players from Denver
Cal Poly Mustangs men's basketball coaches
College men's basketball head coaches in the United States
Colorado State Rams men's basketball coaches
Colorado State Rams men's basketball players
Junior college men's basketball coaches in the United States
Junior college men's basketball players in the United States
Point guards
Southern Utah Thunderbirds men's basketball coaches
Sportspeople from Denver
UC Santa Barbara Gauchos men's basketball coaches